The Netherlands are competing at the 2022 World Athletics Championships in Eugene, Oregon, from 15–24 July 2022.

Medalists

Results

Men  

 Track and road events

 Field events

Women  

 Track and road events

 Field events

 Combined events – Heptathlon

Mixed

References 

Nations at the 2022 World Athletics Championships
2022
2022 in Dutch sport